A monoamine receptor is a receptor for the monoamine neurotransmitters and/or trace amines, endogenous small-molecule signaling molecules with a monoamine structure. The monoamine receptors are almost all G protein-coupled receptors, with the serotonin 5-HT3 receptor being a notable exception as a ligand-gated ion channel. Monoamine receptors are the biological targets of many drugs; such drugs may be referred to as "monoaminergic".

List of receptors
Monoamine receptors include the following classes:

 Adrenergic receptors – bound by epinephrine (adrenaline) and norepinephrine (noradrenaline)
 Dopamine receptors – bound by dopamine
 Histamine receptors – bound by histamine
 Melatonin receptors – bound by melatonin
 Serotonin receptors – bound by serotonin (5-HT)
 Trace amine-associated receptors – bound by trace amines, thyronamines, monoamine neurotransmitters (TAAR1 only), and trimethylamine (TAAR5 only)

References

Transmembrane receptors